Hummingbird vine is a colloquial term for certain climbing plants whose flowers are pollinated by hummingbirds. They are often planted in American gardens to attract these birds.

 Campsis radicans (trumpet vine) of the trumpet-creeper family (Bignoniaceae)
 Ipomoea quamoclit (cypress vine) of the bindweed family (Convolvulaceae)